Stonelands is a rural locality in the South Burnett Region, Queensland, Australia.

Geography 
The locality is bounded to the north-east and east by Barambah Creek, which is a tributary of the Burnett River, and to the south-west by Gayndah Hivesville Road.

Beninfi State Forest is in the north-west of the locality and Woroon State Forest 2 is in the west of the locality extending into neighbouring Wigton.

Apart from the state forests, the predominant land use is grazing on native vegetation with some crop-growing and plantation forestry.

History 
Stonelands State School opened on 25 January 1932 and closed on 31 March 1967. It was at 983 Stonelands Road. It was immediately west of the homestead of Stonelands pastoral station.

Education 
There are no schools in Stonelands. The nearest government primary schools are Windera State School in neighbouring Windera to the north-east, Cloyna State School in Cloyna to the east, and Proston State School in Proston to the south-west. The nearest government secondary schools are Proston State School (to Year 10), Murgon State High School (to Year 12) in Murgon to the south-east and Burnett State College (to Year 12) in Gayndah to the north.

Facilities 
Despite the name, Abbeywood Rural Fire Station is at 6461 Gayndah Hivesville Road in Stonelands; the Gayndah Hivesville Road is the border between the localities of Stonelands and Abbeywood.

References 

South Burnett Region
Localities in Queensland